Mangaore is a small town in the district of Horowhenua, in the southwestern North Island of New Zealand. It is located 4 kilometres southeast of Shannon.

Mangaore Reserve is a park with several sections, one containing Mangaore Hall, and another with walking tracks in an area called "Snake Gully". The hall is run by a local residents association, and can hold up to 200 people.

The town was the headquarters for the construction of the Mangahao Power Station in 1919–1924.

Demographics

The population of Mangaore was 78 in the 2018 New Zealand census, unchanged from the 2013 census, and a decrease of 3 (-3.7%) since the 2006 census. There were 39 males and 36 females, giving a sex ratio of 1.08 males per female. Ethnicities were 66 people  (84.6%) European/Pākehā, 30 (38.5%) Māori, 6 (7.7%) Pacific peoples, and 3 (3.8%) Asian (totals add to more than 100% since people could identify with multiple ethnicities). Of the total population, 21 people  (26.9%) were under 15 years old, 12 (15.4%) were 15–29, 33 (42.3%) were 30–64, and 9 (11.5%) were over 65.

References

Horowhenua District
Populated places in Manawatū-Whanganui